Puan is a town in the province of Buenos Aires, Argentina. It is the administrative centre of the Puan Partido.

Main sights
Monasterio Santa Clara
Laguna de Puan
National Barley Beer Festival

External links

Sitio Oficial de la Municipalidad de Puan  
National Barley Beer Festival  

Populated places in Buenos Aires Province
Populated places established in 1876
1876 establishments in Argentina